Velike Vodenice is a settlement in the foothills of the Gorjanci range in the Municipality of Kostanjevica na Krki in eastern Slovenia. The area is part of the traditional region of Lower Carniola and is now included in the Lower Sava Statistical Region.

There is a small chapel-shrine with a bell tower above its entrance at the crossroads in the centre of the village. It is dedicated to the Virgin Mary and was built in the early 20th century.

References

External links
Velike Vodenice on Geopedia

Populated places in the Municipality of Kostanjevica na Krki